Tom Fuller is an American rock musician based out of Chicago, Illinois, and influenced by Paul McCartney,  Bon Jovi, and Bruce Springsteen.  The first album Chasing an Illusion, was released in 2005.  The follow-up recording Abstract Man was released in 2009, and the track "Only in America" cracked the top 10 in US FMQB Radio Chart AC Format (sharing the honor with Coldplay, Kid Rock and Maroon 5).  The third album Ask, and the first single from the album, "Lovers", was released in the UK on September 5, 2011.  The second single, "Ask" was released in November 2011. He has collaborated with producer Rick Chudacoff on four albums, with Ask featuring Brian Ray and Abe Laboriel Jr of Paul McCartney's band.

In 2014, Tom Fuller released a brand new album FREEDOM accompanied by a complete suite of videos and a full color limited edition graphic novel. The album has been recorded in Nashville and Chicago. It was mixed at Fame Studios in Muscle Shoals, AL and mastered at Abbey Road Studios in London. The feature length suite of video films and Graphic Novel have been co-created by renowned US filmmakers Matt Silver, Steve Petchenik  and Andy Shore and follow a narrative based on a clown subculture called The Sideshow (set in the not too distant future) led by an enigmatic character called The Ringmaster (played by Tom Fuller).

Tom Fuller has played shows with Tesla (band), Little Feat, Cowboy Mouth, dada, The Kyle Gass Band,  Blue Öyster Cult, Robin Trower, Blues Traveler, Rusted Root, UFO (band) Wishbone Ash, The Guess Who, Ted Nugent, and Night Ranger. The band has also played at Summerfest in Milwaukee twice, in 2012 and 2016.

In February 2013, Tom Fuller played a series of dates supporting Little Feat and Wishbone Ash. He performed at Paradiso in Amsterdam, Netherlands; O2 Shepherd's Bush Empire in London, UK ;Union House in Norwich, UK; Oosterpoort in Groningen, Netherlands; Gruenspan in Hamburg, Germany; 
Rosenhof in	Kleinmaischeid, Germany; Zur Linde in Affalter, Germany; Meier Music Hall in Braunschweig, Germany.

In November 2014, Tom Fuller supported Trampled By Turtles on a European tour. They performed at Kranhalle in Munich, Germany; Bang Bang Club in Berlin, Germany; Prinzenbar in Hamburg, Germany; Luxor in Cologne, Germany; La Maroquinerie in Paris, France; and at Paradiso in Amsterdam, Netherlands.

In March 2017, Taylor Guitars announced that they added Tom Fuller to their Artist Relations roster.

Tom Fuller is currently working on his sixth album, Waterfall. It was recorded in Nashville, TN and mixed at Fame Studios in Muscle Shoals, AL. The album was produced by Grammy Award-winning producer Rick Chudacoff.

Discography

 Chasing an Illusion (2005)
 Abstract Man (2008)
 Maristar (2010)
 Ask (2011)
 Freedom (2014)

References

External links
 Official Website
 Southsonic review of album 'Ask'
 'Ask' track listing and credits
 Sundaymercury.net review of 'Ask'
 Rock Gig Reviews review of 'Ask'
 Metal Perspective review of 'Ask'
 Review of 'Ask'

American indie rock musicians
Musicians from Chicago